The Mens Sana Monographs is a peer-reviewed open-access monographic series of mental and physical medicine. It is published by Medknow Publications on behalf of the Mens Sana Research Foundation. Every volume is also published as a book, with a separate ISBN number. The series was established in 2003 as a bimonthly publication but is now published annually since 2007. The editor-in-chief is Ajai R. Singh. Issues are dedicated to a particular theme.

Reception 
The 2006 monograph entitled What Medicine Means to Me was reviewed by the Indian Journal of Psychiatry. Some editorials have been re-published elsewhere.

Abstracting and indexing 
The series is abstracted and indexed in CAB Abstracts, EBSCO databases, Global Health, and Scopus.

References

External links 
 

Psychiatry journals
Monographic series
Open access journals
English-language journals
Medknow Publications academic journals
Annual journals
Publications established in 2003